Afraloa is a monotypic tiger moth genus in the family Erebidae erected by Vladimir Viktorovitch Dubatolov in 2006. Its only species, Afraloa bifurca, was first described by Francis Walker in 1855. It is found in Cameroon, the Democratic Republic of the Congo, Equatorial Guinea, Gabon, Ghana, Kenya, Nigeria, Sierra Leone, the Gambia, Togo, Uganda and Pakistan.

Taxonomy
The type species of Afraloa is Aloa bifurca Walker, 1855. The genus needs a taxonomic review of species.

References

Spilosomina
Monotypic moth genera
Moths of Africa
Moths of Asia